This is the discography of English singer-songwriter and guitarist Newton Faulkner.  He has released seven studio albums, one live album, one EP, one compilation album, 36 singles, and nine music videos.

Albums

Studio albums

Live albums

Compilations

Extended plays

Singles

Music Videos

Other appearances

Footnotes

References

External links
Official site

Pop music discographies
Folk music discographies